Simon Grether (born 20 May 1992) is a Swiss professional footballer who plays as defender or midfielder for FC Rotkreuz in the fourth-tier Swiss 1. Liga.

Club career
Born in Fribourg, Grether started his youth football with local team FC Reinach. In 2006, he transferred to Basel and there he progressed through the ranks. He played in their U-16 and U-18 teams. With both he won the Swiss championship. Later he played in their U-21 team before he signed a two-year professional contract on 24 May 2012. He then joined their first team. He made his first team debut in the Swiss Super League on 13 July 2012, being substituted in, during the 1–0 away win against Servette. He played his first European match in a UEFA Champions League preliminary stage match against Flora Tallinn on 24 July 2012 as Basel won 3–0.

On 31 January 2013, it was announced that Grether was loaned out to Bellinzona in the Swiss Challenge League. He stayed there until the end of the season, playing in nine games. At the beginning of the next season Basel announced that Grether was loaned out to Winterthur.

International career
Grether played his first ever international game for the Switzerland U-18 team on the day before his 18th birthday. On 19 May 2010 the Swiss team beat Ukraine U-18 2–0. Grether made his debut for the Switzerland U-19 team in the 1–1 draw with Czech Republic U-19 on 4 September 2010. He played his debut for the Switzerland U-20 team in the 3–2 win against the Italian U-20 on 31 August 2011.

On 6 February 2013, Grether made his debut for the Swiss U-21 team in the El Madrigal stadium in Villarreal, Spain, being substituted in in the 79th minute. The game ended with a 0–1 defeat against the Slovakian U-21 team.

Titles and honours
Basel
 Swiss champion at U-16 level: 2007–08
 Swiss Cup winner at U-16 level: 2007–08 
 Swiss Champion at U-18 level: 2009–10

External links
 Profile at FC Basel

References

1992 births
People from Fribourg
Sportspeople from the canton of Fribourg
Living people
Association football defenders
Association football midfielders
Swiss men's footballers
Switzerland youth international footballers
Switzerland under-21 international footballers
FC Basel players
AC Bellinzona players
FC Winterthur players
FC Wohlen players
FC Luzern players
Swiss Super League players
Swiss Challenge League players
Swiss Promotion League players
Swiss 1. Liga (football) players